Leboeuf Creek is a stream in Osage County of central Missouri. It is a tributary of the Gasconade River.

The stream source lies just north of Pilot Knob and it runs to the northwest roughly parallel to and southwest of Missouri Route 89. The confluence with the Gasconade is about three-quarters of a mile south of the route 89 bridge.

Leboeuf Creek has the name of the local Lebouef family.

See also
List of rivers of Missouri

References

Rivers of Osage County, Missouri
Rivers of Missouri
Tributaries of the Gasconade River